Our Lady of Tears is one of the Marian invocations attributed to the Virgin Mary and which originated in the apparitions received by Sister Amália of Jesus Flagellated in the chapel of the convent of the Congregation of the Missionary Sisters of Jesus Handcuffed, located in the city of Campinas (in the State of São Paulo, Brazil), in the 1930s.

History

The monastery 
The apparitions happened at the Congregation of the Missionary Sisters of Jesus Crucified, founded by Bishop Francis of Campos Barreto, Bishop of Campinas, and Mother Maria Villac, who lived with Sister Amalia de Jesus Flagelado. The Spanish Galician nun received the phenomenon of the sacred stigmas of Jesus Christ and many Marian apparitions. This nun was part of the group of first sisters and was co-founder of the Congregation itself, and she made her perpetual vows on 8 December 1931.

Apparitions 
In the 1930s, in the chapel of Benjamin Constant Avenue, no. 1344 (corner of Luzitana Street, no. 1331), in Campinas, in the State of São Paulo, Brazil, the Virgin Mary and Jesus Christ would have appeared several times to Sister Amalia of Jesus Flagellated (her baptismal name: Amália Aguirre), communicating many messages to her with calls for prayer, sacrifice and penance. The Virgin Mary, on March 8, 1930, presented herself as Our Lady of Tears and revealed to her the Crown (or Rosary) of Tears.

Ecclesiastical recognition 

On March 8, 1931, Monsignor Francisco de Campos Barreto, Bishop of Campinas, recognized the veracity of the phenomena of stigmata and the apparitions received by Sister Amalia of Jesus Flagellated and granted the proper authorizations – among them, the Imprimatur – for the publication of all her writings (which included the original messages of Jesus and Our Lady) and the prayers of the Crown (or Rosary) of Our Lady of Tears. On February 20, 1934, the same prelate published an episcopal declaration and reinforced the importance of devotion to the Virgin Mary under the invocation of Our Lady of Tears.

In 1935, the Crown of Our Lady of Tears received more authorizations for its dissemination: by Archbishop John Robert Roach of the Archdiocese of Saint Paul and Minneapolis, Minnesota (United States); bishop Michael James Gallagher of the Diocese of Detroit, Michigan (United States); the  diocesan censor in Sopron (Hungary); Bishop Stephanus Breyer of the Diocese of Győr (Hungary); and also by Vicar General Ferdinand Buchwieser of the Archdiocese of Munich and Freising (Germany).

See also 

 Sister Amália de Jesus Flagelado, the visionary of the apparition

Bibliography 
In Portuguese.

 Devocionário de Nossa Senhora das Lagrimas. Santuário, 2021. 
 Irmã Amália e a devoção a Nossa Senhora das Lágrimas. Imaculada, 2022.

References 

Marian apparitions